Drakes Creek is a stream in the U.S. state of Arkansas. It is a tributary to Lollars Creek.

Drakes Creek has the name of a local family of pioneers.

References

Rivers of Madison County, Arkansas
Rivers of Arkansas